Miroslav Pržulj (born 26 March 1959), better known as Lepi Mića, is a Bosnian Serb turbofolk singer-songwriter. He entered the music scene in Sarajevo in 1989 with his album Рулет среће (Roulette of luck). However, he would soon move to Belgrade, where he got married. In 2013, he was invited to the fifth season of the RTV Pink reality show Farma, but later kicked off for hate speech. He was also invited to the seventh season, which he lost. In his songs, he often criticizes the Croatian and Bosnian governments. He has written nine albums, five of which pertained to the Yugoslav Wars or Serbian nationalism.

Discography
 Rulet sreće (1989)
 Garo moja (1990)
 Imao Sam Jednu Ljubav (1991)
 Republiko Srpska (1992)
 Pravoslavci (1993)
 Srbima za sva vremena (1993)
 Gdje cvjetaju božuri (1994)
 Ženo plave kose (1996)
 Svaka me zima na tebe sjeća (1998)
 Oj Srbijo, moja majko (2008)
 Četnički vojvoda Milan II Kuzmanović (2017)

References

1959 births
Living people
Singers from Sarajevo
Serbs of Bosnia and Herzegovina
Male singer-songwriters
Nationalist musicians